Tigrinestola howdeni is a species of beetle in the family Cerambycidae. It was described by Chemsak and Linsley in 1966. It is known from Mexico.

References

Desmiphorini
Beetles described in 1966